WUSY (100.7 FM "U.S. 101") is a commercial radio station licensed to Cleveland, Tennessee, and serving the Chattanooga metropolitan area. The station airs a country music radio format.  Local DJs staff the station by day, with the syndicated Cody Alan Show heard overnight.

WUSY's studios and offices are on Old Lee Highway in Chattanooga.  The transmitter is off Sawyer Cemetery Road in Signal Mountain.

WUSY broadcasts using the HD Radio format. Its country music is heard on HD 1 and an urban contemporary format known as "Real 97.7" is heard on its HD 2 channel and translator W249BR 97.7 FM Lookout Mountain.

History
On August 1, 1961, WCLE-FM first signed on the air.  It was the sister station to AM 1570 WCLE.  Because WCLE was a daytimer, the FM station simulcast the AM's programming by day and continued broadcasting at night.  At first, the station was powered at 5,100 watts and only served the Cleveland area.

In 2000, Cumulus announced it would buy 11 radio stations in 4 markets from iHeartMedia (then known as Clear Channel Communications) in exchange for 25 radio stations in 5 markets plus cash as a part of that company's merger with AMFM Incorporated. Other Clear Channel stations were WLOV (urban contemporary by this time), sports talk WUUS, CHR WKXJ, active rock WRXR (the former WLMX-FM), and oldies WSGC.

On November 1, 2017, iHeartMedia announced that WUSY, along with all of their sister stations in Chattanooga and Richmond, would be sold to Entercom due to that company's merger with CBS Radio. The sale was completed on December 19, 2017.

WUSY is a 8 time winner of the ACM Awards (2006, 2008, 2010, 2012, 2014, 2016, 2018 and 2020) and nominated in 2004, on the CMA Awards, WUSY is a 13 time winner from 1995-2001 (after this, the CMA stated that any station that wins will be ineligible the following year), 2005, 2012, 2014, 2016, 2018 and 2020; their on-air personalities have also won awards in their own right.

WUSY-HD2
W241AF in Rossville, Georgia rebroadcasts WUSY's HD2 channel. On April 2, 2012, this station debuted "The Beat", an urban contemporary format after stunting with "Beat It" by Michael Jackson.  The translator's power was increased from 10 to 250 watts.
 
On November 11, 2014, W241AF/WUSY-HD2 changed format from urban contemporary to classic country, branded as "US101 The Legend 96.1".
 
On November 30, 2016, W241AF/WUSY-HD2 returned to an urban contemporary format from classic country, branded as "Real 96.1".

On November 26, 2021, W241AF split from simulcasting WUSY-HD2 without notice and rebranded as "Real 100.7 HD2".

On August 1, 2022, WUSY-HD2 rebranded as "Real 97.7", simulcasting on translator W249BR 97.7 FM Lookout Mountain.

On-air personalities
Current on-air lineup:
12am-5:30am - CMT After Midnight with Cody Alan
5:30am-10am - Ken & Daniel 
10am-3pm - Katie & Company
3pm-7pm - Mo and StyckMan
7pm-12am  Rob and Holly

Weekend programming includes "The Crook and Chase countdown show", and a Sunday morning gospel program called  "The Gospel Road" with Ken Hicks.

Former on-air personalities:
Bearman (deceased)
David Earl Hughes (deceased)
Capt. Bobby Byrd
Big John Anthony (deceased)
Kim Carson
Dexter (Bill Poindexter)
Brandi (worked the 12AM-6AM slot on weekdays)
Sarah Jennings (Real name Brandi King)
Bob Cox (news)
Big Al McClure
The Real Tug McCoy (Tug Cowart)
Big Zack Evans
Sammy George (Station Manager)
Justin
Cowboy Kyle

References

External links

USY
Country radio stations in the United States
Radio stations established in 1961
1961 establishments in Tennessee
Audacy, Inc. radio stations